QJM, in the past subtitled Monthly Journal of the Association of Physicians and now An International Journal of Medicine, is a British peer-reviewed medical journal which was established in October 1907 as the Quarterly Journal of Medicine. Originally published quarterly, it changed to being a monthly publication at the beginning of 1985. While retaining its original initials for continuity, its name was changed in recognition of its new frequency of publication.

QJM focuses on internal medicine and publishes articles covering medical science and practice. It includes original scientific papers, editorials, reviews, commentary papers to air controversial issues, and a correspondence column.

The journal is published by Oxford University Press on behalf of the Association of Physicians of Great Britain and Ireland. Its current editor-in-chief is Seamas Donnelly. The journal had an impact factor of 14.040 in 2021, according to the Journal Citation Reports.

External links
 

Publications established in 1907
Oxford University Press academic journals
General medical journals
English-language journals
Monthly journals